Taguig National High School commonly abbreviated as T.N.H.S. is a state-owned secondary high school institution in the Philippines. The campus lies at Imelda Romualdez Marcos Road abbreviated as I.R.M. Road and situated at both Barangay Maharlika Village and Barangay New Lower Bicutan.

School History
Established on January 8, 1980, it's called Fort Bonifacio College Annex and changed the name into Taguig Municipal High School by memorandum of agreement in July 1979. The school expanded its area of operation by opening an Annex at Ususan Taguig in 1984. The officer-in-charge, Mrs. Isabelita L. Montesa together with the concerned people worked for transferring the school near Arca South (former F.T.I Terminal) complex to accommodate the large number of enrollees. After the 1986 People Power Revolution, This way for the acquisition of the present location of the school, the former Institution of Rehabilitation for Man (IRM) at New Lower Bicutan. The land is 3,300 square meters with eighteen (18) building housing 79 classrooms, 3 laboratory rooms, 2- school canteens, an Audio Visual Room and 8 Faculty rooms. The school ground is landscaped with trees, vegetables and ornamental plants. A covered court accommodates students having their P.E. activities. At Present, Taguig National High School serves more than 2,500 enrollees with 104 faculty members under the leadership of the newly proclaimed principal, Mr. Santiago T. Alvis.

Information
 Official Website Page : (TNHS Group Website Affairs)
 School Head: Dr. Nelson S. Quintong, (Current)
 Location: I.R.M. road corner A. Reyes st. Barangay New Lower Bicutan, Taguig City, 1632
 School Class: Main Campus / Mother School
 Established: January 8, 1980
 Former Names: Fort Bonifacio College Annex (1980–1982), Taguig Municipal High School (1982–1994), Taguig National High School (1994–present)
 Type: Government public institution
 Land Area: 3,300 square metres
 Faculty Members: 105
 Registered Student: 2,500 enrolled student (2009 est.)
 School Identification Number: 305460
 Division: Taguig City and Pateros
 Region and District: Metro Manila, District 1

Students
Most of the students enrolled in this school is 50% Roman Catholic, 40% Muslim and the 10% goes to others religions such as Iglesia ni Cristo, Born Again and Ang Dating Daan.

Languages
Most of student use Filipino language based on Tagalog as a way to speak in each other. The English language used during English class or in English speaking Zone. The Muslim students use Arabic language during there Madrasa classes, The rest of the student speaks other languages such as Basic Bisaya, 
Japanese, Korean, Spanish, and Thai. As of now, the school administration passed a memorandum that French and Portuguese will be offered as voluntarily and optional language (started in 2012).

Others
Official names
 English: Taguig National High School
 Filipino: Mataas na Paaralang Pambansa ng Taguig
 Spanish: Escuela Nacional Secundaria de Taguig
 Arabic: تاجويج المدرسة الوطنية العلي

References

Educational institutions established in 1980
High schools in Metro Manila
Schools in Taguig